During World War II, Operation San Antonio was the name used for a number of air attacks launched by United States Army Air Forces B-29s flying from bases on Guam to targets in the Tokyo area.  

"San Antonio 1", on 24 November 1944, was the first B-29 attack on the Japanese capital. Of the 110 Superfortresses that left the base, 17 had to abort due to technical reasons, only two dozen bombers found the Musashino aircraft factory, their primary target. The mission was plagued with very high jet stream winds and about 125 defending fighters.

Footnotes 

1944 in Japan
World War II strategic bombing conducted by the United States